Shenasvand (also Romanized as Shenāsvand, Chanāsvand, Chanasband, Chenasband, Chenāsvand, Chinasband, Shanāsfand, Shenāsband, and Shenāsfand) is a village in Qaqazan-e Gharbi Rural District, in the Central District of Takestan County, Qazvin Province, Iran. At the 2006 census, its population was 132, in 27 families.

References 

Populated places in Takestan County